Marco Vistalli (born 3 October 1987 in Alzano Lombardo) is a former Italian sprinter, specializing in 400 metres.

Biography
He was 3rd at 2011 European Team Championships in Stockholm. His personal best, on 400 metres, is 45"38 set in 2010 European Championships in Athletics in Barcelona.

Achievements

See also
 Italian all-time lists - 400 metres
 Italy national relay team

References

External links

1987 births
Italian male sprinters
Living people
Athletics competitors of Fiamme Oro
Italian Athletics Championships winners